, also spelled Katahajime, is a chokehold in judo.  It is one of the twelve constriction techniques of Kodokan Judo in the Shime-waza list.

Description 
Kataha jime uses the lapel of the judo uniform to exert pressure on the carotid arteries (minimal pressure also being applied to the windpipe). The opponent's left arm is lifted and controlled as part of the technique.

Examples of contests this finished

See also
The Canon Of Judo
Tazzmission, a professional wrestling variation, dubbed and utilized by retired professional wrestler Tazz

References

External links
Reverse Kataha jime  from http://www.judoinfo.com
Graphic from http://www.judoinfo.com/techdrw.htm
 Demonstrated from http://home01.wxs.nl/~venro011/movie.htm

Judo technique
Grappling
Grappling hold
Grappling positions
Martial art techniques
Chokeholds